Kurper is a generic name for certain fish in South Africa. It may refer to:
Blue Kurper (Oreochromis mossambicus) or (Oreochromis aureus)
Cape Kurper (Sandelia capensis) 
Rocky Kurper (Sandelia bainsii)
Vlei Kurper (Tilapia sparrmanii)
Redbreast Kurper (Tilapia rendalli)
Canary Kurper (Chetia flaviventris)

Olyf Kurper (Serranochromis Robustus)